John-Patrick Smith was the defending champion, but decided not to participate this year.

Daniel Evans won the title, defeating Edward Corrie 6–3, 6–4 in the final.

Seeds

Draw

Finals

Top half

Bottom half

References
Main Draw
Qualifying Draw

Challenger Banque Nationale de Drummondville
Challenger de Drummondville